P&O Portsmouth was the name for P&O European Ferries' Portsmouth operations from 1999 to 2002 when it was merged with the Dover Operations to become P&O Ferries.

History

P&O Portsmouth was formed in 1999 when P&O European Ferries Portsmouth Operations were named after the merger of the Dover Operations with Stena Line to make P&O Stena Line, when in 2002 P&O bought Stena's 20% share in P&O Stena Line so the North Sea Operations and the Portsmouth operations were merged with the Dover Operations to make P&O Ferries.

The livery of the ships remained the same as before but later the words www.poportsmouth.com were added on the hull until it became P&O Ferries when this was removed and P&O's new livery was placed on ships with poferries.com was added instead.

Demise
P&O Portsmouth was run until 2002, when it was then renamed P&O Ferries and brought under the same management and ownership as P&O on the English Channel which occurred after P&O bought Stena Line 40% share in P&O Stena Line. The operations from Portsmouth remained largely unchanged except from a simple livery change during the 2002-2003 round of refits and services were continued as normal. The eventual demise of the Portsmouth services occurred in 2004 and 2005 when during a business review, along with the other P&O Ferries services, cuts were made.

On 14 January 2005, the Portsmouth-Cherbourg service was closed down and the Pride of Cherbourg was returned to its owners Irish Continental Group and later became Kaitaki for New Zealands Interislander. The Portsmouth-Le Havre network then later closed down in September 2005 when Pride of Portsmouth and Pride of Le Havre were returned to TT-Line and laid up in Falmouth prior to their sale to SNAV. Only the Portsmouth-Bilbao service remained but was also closed down in 2010 when the charter of Pride of Bilbao expired in September 2010, she was also herself returned to Irish Continental Group and later became Princess Anastasia for St. Peter Line in Russia.

The also short-lived Portsmouth-Caen service was closed down in October 2004 along with the Cherbourg link when the Caen Express (Max Mols) was returned to Mols-Linien.

Former routes
Portsmouth to:
Le Havre
Cherbourg
Bilbao
Caen

Former fleet
Portsmouth Express
Pride of Bilbao
Pride of Cherbourg (2)
Pride of Cherbourg (3)
Pride of Cherbourg A
Pride of Hampshire
Pride of Le Havre (2)
Pride of Portsmouth
Caen Express
Superstar Express

References

Defunct shipping companies of the United Kingdom
Ferry companies of England
Ferry companies of France
Ferry companies of Spain
P&O (company)